Rayleigh  is a market town and civil parish in the Rochford District in Essex, England; it is located between Chelmsford and Southend-on-Sea,  east of central London. It had a population of 32,150 at the census in 2011.

Toponymy
The name Rayleigh is Old English in origin deriving from rǣge ('female roe-deer or she-goat') and lēah ('clearing'). Therefore, the name means overall 'wood or clearing of the wild she-goats or roe-deer".

History

Prehistoric and Roman times
There has been a scattering of stray finds around the town from Prehistoric and Roman times, including some Roman roof and hypocaust tiles found within the fabric of Rayleigh Church. This suggests that there was a Roman habitation site within the area. However, there is little evidence of any density of population here during this period.

Saxon era
One significant archaeological find was in the early 2000s at the western edge of Rayleigh, at the site of the former Park School in Rawreth Lane. An early Saxon cemetery site was discovered here, with 144 cremation burials and evidence of just one high-status female inhumation burial.

By the end of the Saxon period, there was definitely a village here, as it is recorded in the Domesday Book of 1086 when it was held by Swein of Essex, the son of Robert FitzWimarc.

The most significant historic monument in Rayleigh is the great medieval mound of Rayleigh Castle. This was an early Norman motte and bailey castle, of which only the motte and its surrounding embankments remain. Despite the loss of its timber superstructure and later stone buildings, its height and bulk mean that it still dominates the town centre.

Later medieval period (1154–1485)
A courthouse was erected in Rayleigh in 1338. This was apparently resented by the townspeople, who turned out in force to destroy it, with 20 ringleaders later arrested and tried.

The forests around Rayleigh were royal hunting grounds. It is recorded that King Henry III hunted here in 1222, and three King Edwards also visited.

One of the oldest secular building in Rayleigh is 91 High Street which houses Pizza Express downstairs and Rayleigh Town Museum upstairs. The Regal Room in the museum is dated circa 1350. It is suspected that some of Rayleigh's older Brick build buildings may contain portions older than this.

Rayleigh Castle gradually fell into disuse, and in 1394 King Richard II gave permission for the townspeople of Rayleigh to use the foundations as a source of stone. By this time, the site was in royal ownership and used for pasture:
 know all men of special grace who have the will to repair certain Chapel in the said town and to build a new a certain belfry we have granted them the foundations and to take away and use any stones found therein".

Tudors and Stuarts
Records indicate that the church was rich in plate, vestments and stained glass, but these were disposed of:
 "No church within the hundred was more splendidly adorned; none were so richly furnished with plate, vestments and other accessories for the celebration of the divine service; none were so rich in painted glass; none have been more mercilessly despoiled"

During Henry VIII's reign, deer were constantly taken from here to replenish the herds in Greenwich Park.

Modern

During the 1990s many new housing estates appeared on formerly greenfield areas of the town, with the East of England region currently pushing for even more homes to be built in the area. This has caused some controversy locally, with residents of Rayleigh feeling that the areas surrounding the town should be preserved with more care.

Governance

The civil parish of Rayleigh became part of Rochford Rural District in 1894.  In 1929 it was combined with Rawreth to form the Urban District of Rayleigh, which was abolished in 1974 when the area became part of the District of Rochford.

The constituency of Rayleigh and Wickford is represented in the House of Commons by the Member of Parliament Mark Francois of the Conservative Party.

In 2018 Rochford District Council has 25 Conservative members, 3 Liberal Democrats, 3 Green Party, 2 Labour, 4 independents and 4 members from Rochford Residents Party sitting on the council.

Rayleigh Town council is also Conservative controlled, comprising 18 Conservatives, 4 Liberal Democrats, and 1 independent.

Rayleigh Town Council have major responsibilities which include:
Consultee on Planning applications in Rayleigh.
Christmas Lights and organisation of switch-on event in Town Centre, King George V Playing Field in Eastwood Road, floral displays in Town Centre and entry to Annual Anglia in Bloom competition, CCTV in Town Centre, benches, salt bins, litter bins, bus shelters, some street lighting, heritage and memorial plaques, and the Town Centre clock.
Four Allotment sites within Rayleigh with over 100 plots
Consultee on crime & disorder reduction strategy within Rochford District Member of Rayleigh Windmill management committee.

The Civic Suite and Information Centre includes the Council Chamber, Committee Rooms, Transportation and Hackney Carriage Office and is located on Hockley Road.  The Citizens Advice Bureau and Registrar's Office are also located here. The Civic Suite is a 19th century mansion house known as "Barringtons" which was converted for municipal use in 1953 and extended in 1964.

Transport
Rayleigh is served by two prominent modes of public transport: bus and train.

Bus services are run by Arriva Southend and First Essex. Arriva services usually terminate at Rayleigh railway station, whereas First Essex services travel further afield to Hullbridge, Wickford, Basildon and Chelmsford. First Essex also operate an hourly bus service to Stansted Airport, numbered X30, which makes a stop at Rayleigh railway station.

Greater Anglia operate railway services between Southend Victoria and London Liverpool Street. Trains run generally every 20 minutes during the day from Rayleigh station in both directions.

Education

Rayleigh has two secondary schools: The Sweyne Park School, formed by the amalgamation of the Sweyne and Park schools, and FitzWimarc School. It also has seven primary schools – Down Hall, Edward Francis, Grove Wood, Our Lady of Ransom (Catholic), Rayleigh Primary and Wyburns. The seventh, Glebe Primary School with UHI, was created in September 2014 through the amalgamation
of Glebe Infant and Nursery School and Glebe Junior School. In addition, St Nicholas C of E Primary School, a long-established school for the adjoining village of Rawreth, moved in 2006 to a new building just on the Rayleigh side of the parish boundary.

Sport and recreation

Rayleigh has a golf club on the outskirts of the town; Rayleigh Club (previously Lords Golf & Country Club) is situated on Hullbridge Road to the north of the town. This was originally opened in 1991 as Hanover Golf Club on the site of Hanover Farm and was designed by Reg Plumbridge.

Parks/playing fields

Rayleigh has a number of parks and playing fields.

King George V playing field

The playing field is located next to Bull Lane, Hockley Road and Websters Way.

It contains a snack bar and pavilion, as well as a Teen shelter

Its two grass football pitches are used by Rayleigh FC, Chronicles FC and Ralee FC. It also has a skate park and a children's playground, containing a variety of play equipment. The park is also home to Rayleigh Bowls Club, who lease the use of the pavilion.

Rayleigh Lions holds an annual fireworks display on the playing field.

Sweyne Park

Sweyne Park is controlled by Rochford District Council. It is situated north of Sweyne Park School and can be accessed in several ways. The entrance in Downhall Park Way has a small car park and there is a play area. It has another smaller entrance in Downhall Park Way, adjacent to Canterbury Close; it can also be accessed from Victoria Avenue. In 2008, an entrance was established from Priory Chase. The park has a pond.

 Fairview Playing Field, Victoria Road TQ814914
 Grove Playing Field, Grove Road TQ825904
 John Fisher Playing Field (Little Wheatleys Chase, Rayleigh) TQ789914

Kingley Wood stands on a steep hill slope beside the A127 and is visible as you approach Rayleigh from London. The small wood is the only surviving ancient wood in Rayleigh, but it has rich and varied wildlife and a well-documented history.

Wheatley Wood
This is a  broadleaved wood established in the late 1990s.
The wood was designed and planted by a partnership of Local people and the Woodland Trust.
There is a car park at the Grange Community Centre in Little Wheatley Chase and access to the wood is across the playing fields.

Greyhounds and speedway
At least two greyhound racing tracks existed in the town. The main venue was the Rayleigh Weir Stadium which also hosted speedway and traded from 1948-1974.

A smaller short lived track at O'Tooles Meadow, Wickford Road, off the Down Hall Road also hosted greyhound racing and dirt track speedway. The racing was independent (not affiliated to the sports governing body the National Greyhound Racing Club) and was known as a flapping track, which was the nickname given to independent tracks. The track opened in 1932, but the date of closure is not known; it is possible that it may have been the same venue known as the Rayleigh Sports Stadium, although it is also possible that the Rayleigh Sports Stadium may have been a third separate venue.

Public facilities
 

There is a small outdoor market on Wednesdays. Until 2011 it was located next to Rayleigh Civic Suite and Information Centre, opposite Holy Trinity Church. In 2011 it moved to the taxi rank in the town's High Street (outside Boots).
The market dates back to before 1181 when it was inscribed in the Exchequer Records of Henry II.

The Dutch Cottage, the smallest and oldest council house in the United Kingdom, can be visited on Wednesdays by prior appointment.

Rayleigh Windmill has been renovated, including a structural renovation of the 19th century brick built building has now been completed. The basic external brickwork has been repaired and the interior has been transformed to provide four storeys of modern display facilities which has turned the windmill into a major tourist and educational attraction in the county. The changes to the windmill allow the public to view the interior and to exploit this local historic amenity for cultural, educational and tourism use.

Rayleigh Mount, a National Trust property adjacent to Rayleigh Windmill, is the site of a Domesday castle erected by Sweyn of Essex with distinctive motte-and-bailey defences. Edward Belcham Francis gave the Mount to the National Trust in 1923. From its summit it offers sweeping views across the Crouch Valley.

Rayleigh Town Museum
Rayleigh Town Museum occupies the  1st floor at 91 High Street and contains many artifacts telling the history of Rayleigh.

Religion

The Church of England parish church of the Holy Trinity is at the top of the High Street. A church existed on the site in Saxon times and the present building has a Norman chancel. The bell tower was built in the 15th century and includes stone taken from the castle when that fell into disuse. The church has an impressive Tudor brick porch. The Gothic Revival architect C.C. Rolfe restored the chancel in 1873.

The parish church of Saint Michael and All Angels is in Sir Walter Raleigh Drive near Sweyne School. It was built in the 1950s when Rayleigh expanded considerably. It has a multi-purpose building which is used by other local groups as well as the church.

Our Lady of Ransom Catholic Church is on London Hill.

The United Reformed Church is on Crown Hill.

The Baptist Church is in the High Street. The building opened for worship on 25 March 1799, shortly before the first Pastor, Rev James Pilkington, was inducted in June 1799. In June 1979, work started on a church extension. This added significantly more seating and completed some much needed repairs.

The Methodist Church is on Eastwood Road. (Moved from the High Street in 1934).

Grange Free Church is on London Road, at the junction with Langdon Road.

The Salvation Army are located on the corner of the High Street and Love Lane. The building was the original 1884 Methodist Church, which was sold to the Salvation Army in 1934 when the Methodist Church moved to a larger site in Eastwood Road.

Gallery

References

Sources

 Burrows, John William. (1909). Southend on Sea and District: Historical Notes. .
 English Place-Name Society. (2008). The Survey of English Place-Names: Rayleigh. Institute for Name-Studies. Retrieved 2008-06-28.
 Essex County Council. (1999). Historic Town Assessment Report for Rayleigh. Retrieved 2008-06-28
 Percival, Geoff. (2007-06-05). work= Overwhelming objections to homes plan. Southend Echo. Retrieved 2008-06-28.

 Rayleigh Civic Society. (2006). History of Rayleigh. Rayleigh Chamber of Trade and Commerce. Retrieved 2008-06-28.
 Rayleigh Civic Society. (2006). Holy Trinity Church. Rayleigh Chamber of Trade and Commerce. Retrieved 2008-06-28.

External links
Rayleigh Town Museum
Rayleigh Chamber of Trade- Section on Rayleigh's history
National Trust – Rayleigh Mount

 
Market towns in Essex
Rochford District
Towns in Essex